The 2014 FIBA Europe Under-18 Championship for Women Division C was the 9th edition of the Division C of the FIBA U18 Women's European Championship, the third tier of the European women's under-18 basketball championship. It was played in Andorra la Vella, Andorra, from 22 to 27 July 2014. Cyprus women's national under-18 basketball team won the tournament.

Participating teams

First round

Group A

Group B

Playoffs

Final standings

References

2014
2014–15 in European women's basketball
FIBA U18
Sports competitions in Andorra la Vella
FIBA